Grey Owl is a 1999 biopic directed by Richard Attenborough and starring Pierce Brosnan in the role of real-life British schoolboy turned Native American trapper "Grey Owl", Archibald Belaney (1888–1938), and Annie Galipeau as his wife Anahareo, with brief appearances by Graham Greene and others. The screenplay was written by William Nicholson. The film was released on 10 September 1999 in Spain and 15 February 2000 in US. It was the last film made by Largo Entertainment before it went defunct in 1999.

Plot 
Archibald Belaney (Brosnan) was a British man who grew up fascinated with Native American culture—so much so that in the early 1900s he left the United Kingdom of Great Britain and Ireland for Canada, where he reinvented himself as Archie Grey Owl and pretended to be a First Nations native who was a trapper. Eventually, Belaney becomes an environmentalist after renouncing trapping and hunting.

Cast 
 Pierce Brosnan as Archibald "Grey Owl" Belaney
 Annie Galipeau as Anahareo
 Nathaniel Arcand as Ned White Bear 
 Vlasta Vrána as Harry Champlin
 David Fox as Jim Wood
 Charles Powell as Walter Perry
 Stephanie Cole as Ada Belaney
 Renée Asherson as Carrie Belaney 
 Stewart Bick as Cyrrus Finney 
 Graham Greene as Jim Bernard
 Saginaw Grant as Pow Wow Chief

Production 
The film was shot in the English town of Hastings, Quebec towns Chelsea and Wakefield, Jacques Cartier Park and Saskatchewan's Prince Albert National Park.

Director Richard Attenborough said in an interview that he and his brother, noted presenter and naturalist David Attenborough, had attended "Grey Owl's" De Montfort Hall, Leicester lecture in 1936, depicted in the film, and been influenced by his advocacy of conservation. The musical group Northern Cree Singers is featured in the soundtrack.

Canadian naturalist and canoe tripper Hap Wilson taught Pierce Brosnan how to throw an axe and paddle a canoe for his role.

Release
The film opened 1 October 1999 on 70 screens in Canada.

The film premiered on video in the United States on 15 February 2000. It eventually opened on 3 November 2000 in the United Kingdom.

Critical reception
The film was met with negative reviews. It has a 17% approval rating on review aggregator Rotten Tomatoes based on 12 reviews, with an average rating of 4.6/10. William Gallagher of the BBC said, "if you like cuddly animals or you fancy Pierce Brosnan, you're in luck".

The film won one Genie Award at the 20th Genie Awards, in the category of Best Costume Design for Renée April.

Box office
Grey Owl flopped at the box office upon its limited release grossing $162,360 in its opening weekend in Canada and a total of $632,617 against its $30 million budget.

References

External links 

1999 films
1990s adventure drama films
1990s biographical drama films
British biographical drama films
British adventure drama films
Environmental films
First Nations films
Films about Native Americans
Films directed by Richard Attenborough
Films set in 1934
Films set in 1935
Films set in 1936
Films set in Ontario
Films set in Sussex
Films shot in England
Films shot in Quebec
Films shot in Saskatchewan
Films with screenplays by William Nicholson
Films scored by George Fenton
Canadian biographical drama films
English-language Canadian films
Canadian adventure drama films
Films produced by Richard Attenborough
Largo Entertainment films
Viacom Pictures films
1999 drama films
American biographical drama films
American adventure drama films
1990s English-language films
1990s American films
1990s Canadian films
1990s British films